(7 May 1984 – 18 June 2008) was a Japanese actress, model and singer. Throughout her career, she starred as Sailor Moon in the Sailor Moon musicals, as well as portraying Hinaka Tachibana in Kamen Rider Hibiki and Kyouko Kakehi in Battle Royale II. In addition to acting, Kanbe also pursued a singing career, where her songs were used as the theme songs to the anime series Mermaid Melody Pichi Pichi Pitch.

Career

Kanbe portrayed Sailor Moon in the Sailor Moon musicals. Kanbe was chosen out of 500 women for the role. Much of her career involved physically demanding roles.

As late as June 2008, she had been active and vocally expressing an interest in furthering her career. 
She was cast in the role of Eponine in the Japanese production of Les Misérables and in Miss Saigon, but was forced to give them up due to poor health in February 2007.

Death
Since February 2007, Kanbe had been in and out of the hospital until dying from sudden heart failure on 18 June 2008 at 4:08 am. Her funeral was held in Kawasaki, Kanagawa on 21 June 2008.

Filmography

Live-action television
Moero!! Robocon (1999), Nanako Yokokawa (episode 43)
D-girls Idol Tantei San Shimai Monogatari (2001) (episode 11)
Hatchobori no Nana Nin (2003), Oyumi (episode 3)
Kamen Rider Hibiki (2005–2006), Hinaka Tachibana
Kyoto Chiken no Onna (2006), Tamiko Kuraki

Television animation
Yume ☆ Ouen Tai (1999–2000)
Ikaring no Menseki (2000), apparently at HYPER GO Gou
Ucchan Nanchan no Urinari!! (2001–2002)
LF+R Morning YOUNG LIVE JAPAN / Young Live Nippon LF+R Music TV (2001–2003)
Baku NEW (2001–2002)
Mermaid Melody Pichi Pichi Pitch (2003), Auri (episode 34)

Film
Battle Royale II (2003), Kyouko Kakehi
69 sixty nine (2004)
Kamen Rider Hibiki & The Seven Fighting Demons (2005), Hinaka Tachibana / Hinako

Theatre

 Sailor Moon musicals (2000–2001) as Usagi Tsukino
 2000 Winter Special Musical Bishōjo Senshi Sailor Moon

 2000 Summer Special Musical Bishōjo Senshi Sailor Moon

 2001 Winter Special Musical Bishōjo Senshi Sailor Moon

 2001 Spring Special Musical Bishōjo Senshi Sailor Moon

 Spider's Nest (30 November 2001 – 9 December 2001 at Tokyo Globe Theater)
 The prosecution witness (2002, Ginza Theatre)
 Musical Forest is Alive (21–29 August 2004) as Queen
 Love Hotels – LOVE×HOTEL (6–16 October 2005)

Discography

Singles

DVD
 Kanbe Miyuki 〜MOON Letter〜 (PONY CANYON, Released 21 June 2000)
 THE COMPLETE Kanbe Miyuki (Released 25 April 2001)
 Metamorphose! (Frontier Works, Released 25 November 2004)
 Amaretto ~Beware~ (Released 20 May 2006)

Photobooks
 I am Rainbow ☆ (Released 25 July 2000)  
 Navi (Released 30 September 2004) 

– Digital Photobook

 Kanbe Miyuki @ Digital Photocollection (December 2001)

References

External links
Official profile for Miyuki Kanbe, rouge 
 
Interview with Miyuki Kanbe 

1984 births
2008 deaths
Anime musicians
Japanese stage actresses
Japanese women pop singers
Japanese gravure idols
Japanese television personalities
Musicians from Kanagawa Prefecture
21st-century Japanese women singers
21st-century Japanese singers